Michael Alfred Anchondo (born April 15, 1982) is an American former professional boxer who held the WBO Super featherweight title.

Professional career

Anchondo signed turned pro in 2000 at the age of 18 and won his first 24 fights most of which were fought in southern california. His 25th fight was for the vacant WBO super featherweight title in 2004 in which he faced Pablo Chacón in Miami. He comfortably outpointed Chacón over 12 rounds and knocked Chacon down in the final round with two minutes remaining. It was a short reign, as he was stripped of the title for being nearly being 5 lbs. overweight during the weigh-in, his opponent Jorge Rodrigo Barrios ended up winning via 4th round stoppage in a bout that was televised by ESPN Friday Night Fights. In 2007, he was upset by former amateur standout Darling Jimenez, dashing any imminent title hopes. He retired from fighting in 2010 at the relatively young age of 28.

Professional boxing record

See also
List of super-featherweight boxing champions

References

External links

1982 births
Living people
Super-featherweight boxers
World super-featherweight boxing champions
World Boxing Organization champions
American male boxers
Boxers from Los Angeles